John H. Gillespie is an evolutionary biologist interested in theoretical population genetics and molecular evolution. In molecular evolution, he emphasized the importance of advantageous mutations and balancing selection. For that reason, Gillespie is well known for his selectionist stance in the neutralist-selectionist debate. He is widely considered the main proponent of natural selection in molecular evolution.  He had a well-known feud with the father of the neutral theory of molecular evolution, Motoo Kimura, initiated by a 1984 review in Science of Kimura's book in which Gillespie criticized Kimura for "using the book as a vehicle to establish for himself a niche in the history of science." Gillespie had only four Ph.D. students during his career: Richard Hudson, James N. McNair, David Cutler, and Andrew Kern, but mentored many more. Gillespie was a professor in the College of Biological Sciences at the University of California, Davis until his retirement in 2005.

References

 Blum, D. (1992). "Scientists in Open War over "Neutral Theory" of Genetics". Sacramento Bee, March 16, p.A1.

Evolutionary biologists
Population geneticists
University of California, Davis faculty
Living people
Year of birth missing (living people)